The majority of Chinese nationals currently residing in Samoa are businessmen, labour workers, and shopowners in the southwestern Pacific island nation of Samoa, and there are at least 30,000 people in Samoa who are of mixed Samoan and Chinese descent, although they are classified as ethnic Samoans in official census. Around the world, about 25% of all Samoans claim Chinese ancestry. Nearly all Chinese nationals in Samoa reside within the Apia municipal area; neighbouring American Samoa, also has a small population of Chinese expatriates.

The Chinese community in Samoa is growing and becoming economically strong. A new wave of northern Chinese migrants are moving to Samoa, bringing their culture and languages with them. There are no Chinese schools in Samoa but an estimated 98.7% of Chinese expatriates and migrants send their children and youth to Robert Louis Stevenson School, Samoa which is a private school with an Australasian and Samoan curriculum. There is a primary campus located in the village of Lotopa, Faleata District and the secondary campus in the urban village of Tafaigata. Notable Chinese businesses include Frankie's Supermarket and Wholesale, Alan Wholesale, and Treasure Garden, as well as other small businesses and restaurants. An estimated 4000 Chinese tourists visit Samoa every year via Apia's Faleolo International Airport.

History
Historical records of Chinese settlement dates back to at least the 1870s. Two Chinese sailors under the command of Bully Hayes were based there for two years, and one of them settled down in 1876 and married a Samoan wife. A few Chinese traders also settled in Samoa and raised local families, and maintained close ties with Samoa's paramount chief, Malietoa Laupepa. In 1880, Malietoa issued a subsequent ban on people of Chinese descent from settling in Samoa. Four years after Western Samoa came under German rule in 1899, the colonial governor Wilhelm Solf lifted Malietoa's ban and shipped in Chinese labourers from 1903 onwards. Chinese labourers reportedly complained of tough working punishments as well as brutal physical punishments which they had to face, and these reports prompted the provincial governor of Canton to stop sending Chinese labourers to the German colonies.

Chinese immigrants were almost entirely men, and most of the labourers took Samoan women as wives and by 1918 offspring of Chinese-Samoan descent were a visible minority, although smaller in terms of population compared to offspring of European (particularly German) and Samoan descent. This eventually led to a ban in 1931 that prohibited Chinese men from interacting with Samoan women on all grounds. By the end of World War II only 295 Chinese remained, all of whom had either taken Samoan wives or were unmarried. Many Chinese labourers had since returned to China or remained in Samoa with their families.

In 1994, China provided financial assistance to fund the construction of the government office building in Apia. More recently the Chinese government has funded various other Samoan government construction projects. Aeau Peniamina, deputy leader of the Samoa Democratic United Party, caused a minor controversy in January 2005 when he remarked that "there are too many Chinese in the country". Joe Keil, the Minister of Tourism, who is of part-Chinese descent, promptly rebutted Peniamina's remarks.

Chinese-Samoans are well represented in the civil service, and China established diplomatic relations with Samoa in November 1975. Chinese-Samoans are especially well represented in the retail, import-export, and restaurant sectors, notably in Apia.

Samoa's legislative capital city, Apia, signed a treaty on 31 August 2015 with a delegation from Shenzhen, China, making Apia and Shenzhen, Guangdong, China sister cities. The treaty will help promote Chinese tourism to boost Samoa's growing tourism industry, bring economic growth to Samoa, and encourage stronger ties between the two cities. Shenzhen Airlines is also set to operate flights from Shenzhen International Airport and Faleolo International Airport in Apia.

Language
The majority of the Chinese indentured labourers came from the Guangdong province and generally spoke Cantonese or Hakka as their primary language. However, their descendants in Samoa have adopted Samoan and English as their mother tongues, while Cantonese is still reportedly spoken by a few elderly people. Since the 1980s, the overwhelming majority of Chinese immigrants and enterprises are derived from mainland China where Mandarin Chinese is spoken.

Cultural contribution
The cultural legacy of Chinese laborers in Samoa is readily apparent in the various Chinese dishes that have been adopted into Samoan cuisine. Chinese immigrants brought their culinary traditions with them to Samoa, where rice (alaisa), noodles (lialia), cha siu bao (keke pua'a), chop suey (sapasui), and Chinese pastries (keke saina, masi saina) have all been adopted into standard Samoan cuisine. Several food items such as taro, arrowroot, and sugarcane were already familiar to the Chinese and Samoans prior to colonial times.

Entrepreneurship, commerce, frugality, and communal investment are all business practices and cultural traits that facilitated the rise of Chinese immigrants from plantation laborers to business owners, shopkeepers, and trading moguls. The commercial and financial contribution of the Chinese continued as more Samoan-Chinese marriages and business arrangements were made. This Chinese-Samoan prevalence in modern Samoa is still apparent in the many prominent firms in Apia that bear Chinese names, such as Ah Liki Wholesale, Apia Central Hotel (proprietor, Ah Kam family), Leung Wai Legal Services, Chan Chui & Sons, Ltd, Ah Him Co., Treasure Garden (Chen Pao family), etc.

Despite obvious physical and cultural differences, it became apparent to both the Cantonese and the Samoans that their cultures shared much in common, and intermarriage since the 1870s has resulted in a large proportion of ethnic Samoans having Chinese ancestry today. Respect for parents, veneration of ancestors, and strong extended family and clan relationships were mutually shared customs.

The traditional Chinese camphor chest (jeung seung, 樟箱) has become commonplace in Samoan homes, where they are called atola'au. Ornately carved furniture and wall panels have also been adopted, often with Samoan-themed carvings and inlay.

Names
Many people of Chinese descent in Samoa took their fathers' first names as their surnames, rather than their actual Chinese surnames due to Chinese personal naming convention where the family name is written first and the given name next. Many of these names are of Cantonese origin, as the majority of the Chinese who settled in Samoa came from Taishan and Panyu. Chinese-Samoans often have surnames that start with "Ah," "Po," or "Ho" and common examples of Chinese-Samoan families include Ah Seu, Ah Kuoi, Ah Van, Ah Mu (of whom some descendants have adopted the name "Rivers"), Po Ching, Ah You, Ho Ching, Ah Kam, Ah Liki, Ah Sam, Ah Mau, Ah Ching, Ah Fong, Ah Loe and Ah Wong. The retention of the "Ah" prefix is also common in Chinese-Hawaiian surnames, such as Akina, Ahuna, Akee, Akiona and Akaka. The practice stems from the Cantonese word "ah" (阿) used before proper names when respectfully addressing family members - as in "ah-po" (阿婆), maternal grandmother; "ah-gong" (阿公), maternal grandfather; "ah-ma" (阿嫲), paternal grandmother, etc. Likewise, some European-Samoan names begin with "Misi," the Samoan transliteration of "Mister" (Mr.) - as in Misiluki ("Mr. Luke"), Misimua/Misimoa ("Mr. Moors"), Misipaulo ("Mr. Paul"), Misitea ("Mr. Stair"), and Misikea ("Mr. Gurr")

Notable Samoans of Chinese descent

 See :Category:Samoan people of Chinese descent
 Eveni Tafiti, Multicultural Counselor of Weber State University
 Verona Lovel Parker, Miss Samoa 1997
Muagututagata Peter Ah Him, Deputy Prime Minister of Samoa
Papaliitele Niko Lee Hang, Minister of Communication and Information Technology and member of 15th Samoan Parliament
Harrison Hansen, New Zealand rugby league footballer.
Patrick Ah Van, New Zealand rugby league footballer.
Frank-Paul Nu'uausala, New Zealand rugby league footballer.
Hans Keil, Ministry of Tourism, Samoa
Leeson Ah Mau, New Zealand rugby league footballer.
Michael Chee-Kam, New Zealand rugby league footballer.

References

Bibliography
 
 Crocombe, R. G., Asia in the Pacific Islands: Replacing the West, 2007, 
 Pan, Lynn, The Encyclopedia of the Chinese Overseas, Harvard University Press, 1999, 
 Tu'u'u, Misilugi Tulifau Tofaeono, History of Samoa Islands: Supremacy & Legacy of the Malietoa, Tuga'ula Publication, 2002, 
 Tom, Nancy Y.W. The Chinese in Western Samoa 1975–1985. Apia: Western Samoan Historical and Cultural Trust

External links
 Chinese in the Pacific: a bibliography
 Ah Kuoi 'Aiga
 Black Saturday: Samoa's Mau

Samoan
Chinese diaspora in Oceania